Geleta is a surname. Notable people with the surname include:

Bekele Geleta, Ethiopian non-profit executive
Ján Geleta (born 1943), Slovak football player